Latvian Football Cup 2009–10 was the sixty-eighth season of the Latvian annual football knock-out competition. For the first time the cup season switched from calendar year to fall/spring season. The winners, Jelgava, qualified for the second qualifying round of the UEFA Europa League 2010–11.

First round

Second round

Third round

Quarterfinals
The eight winners from the previous round compete in this round. These matches took place on 14 April 2010.

|}

Semifinals
The four winners from the previous round compete in this round. These matches took place on 28 April 2010.

|}

Final

External links
 Latvian Cup on rsssf.com
 LFF.lv

2009-10
2009–10 domestic association football cups
Cup
Cup